The large-headed capuchin (Sapajus apella macrocephalus) is a subspecies of the tufted capuchin monkey from South America. It is found in Bolivia, Brazil, Colombia, Ecuador and Peru. It was formerly thought to be its own species (S. macrocephalus), but studies have found it to be a subspecies of the tufted capuchin.

References

External links

large-headed capuchin
Mammals of Colombia
Mammals of Venezuela
Mammals of Ecuador
Mammals of Brazil
Mammals of Bolivia
Mammals of Peru
Subspecies
large-headed capuchin
Primates of South America
Taxa named by Johann Baptist von Spix